Anicka van Emden (born 10 December 1986) is a Dutch retired judoka who won a bronze medal at the 2016 Summer Olympics in Rio de Janeiro (shared with Yarden Gerbi). She also won bronze medals at the 2011 and 2013 World Judo Championships.

Since 2007 she works 16 hours a week as a radio diagnostic technician at the Haaglanden Medical Centre in The Hague.

References

External links

 

1986 births
Living people
Dutch female judoka
Sportspeople from The Hague
Judoka at the 2016 Summer Olympics
Olympic judoka of the Netherlands
Olympic bronze medalists for the Netherlands
Olympic medalists in judo
Medalists at the 2016 Summer Olympics
20th-century Dutch women
21st-century Dutch women